The Salado River is a river in northern Buenos Aires Province, Argentina.

The river flows by the cities of Junín, Roque Pérez, and General Belgrano, as well as a number of wetlands and lakes; channelization of the lower course has improved the drainage of the river's . Nearly 1 million people live in the basin.

Hydrological studies have been performed in the Salado basin, principally in the Azul, Buenos Aires creek basin by the Instituto de Hidrologia de Llanuras de Azul. Ecological studies have been done by the Ecology group of Facultad de Agronomía de la UNICEN.

In the 19th century, before the Conquest of the Desert, the Salado River served as frontier boundary between the Spanish colonised lands and those still under control of the indigenous peoples.

Because Argentina has another, more important Salado River, in the northern part of the country, this Salado River is sometimes called Salado del Sur ("Southern Salado").

See also
 List of rivers of Argentina

References

Rivers of Buenos Aires Province
La Plata basin
Rivers of Argentina